Balochi, sometimes spelt in various other ways, may refer to:

 Balochi language, a language of Iran, Pakistan and Afghanistan
 an adjective for something related to the Baloch people, an ethnic group of Iran, Pakistan and Afghanistan
 an adjective for something related to any of the other entities known as Baloch
 Baluchi (disambiguation), several places with the name in Iran and Afghanistan

See also 
 
 Bellucci, an Italian surname
 Balochistan

Language and nationality disambiguation pages